"Chuck Versus the Beard" is the ninth episode in the third season of the television series Chuck. It originally aired March 8, 2010, and was the television directorial debut of series star Zachary Levi. Chuck is benched when he fails to flash, and when the rest of the team is diverted by a decoy, must reveal his secret to Morgan so he can help foil a Ring plot to destroy Castle.

Plot summary

Much like "Chuck Versus the Marlin" in the show's first season, virtually all the main characters are in some way directly connected with the main storyline of "Chuck Versus the Beard". As the episode begins, Chuck is benched by Shaw when he fails to flash for a whole week in the aftermath of the team's previous mission. He declines an offer by Sarah to talk through the emotional issues interfering with the Intersect, and is rebuffed by Devon, who has taken a vacation with Ellie to escape Chuck's spy life. Back at the Buy More, Morgan calls him into his office for "disciplinary action". Morgan reveals that Hannah quit after Chuck broke up with her, and asks Chuck to talk to him about what's happening. Chuck tries to talk to Morgan, but to protect his secret, is unable to. Morgan unceremoniously "fires" Chuck as his best friend.

Meanwhile, Sarah, Shaw and Casey head to a hotel where the Ring is attempting to turn a CIA agent. With Chuck unable to flash on the target's identity, it is left to the rest of the team to stakeout the hotel and attempt to identify him before it's too late. While they're away, Big Mike announces to the Buy More staff that their store is being sold and that representatives from Cost-Less — Del (Diedrich Bader) and Neil (Cedric Yarbrough) — will be interviewing the employees while the building is inspected prior to the sale.

The Buy More Interviews

The Buy More staff agrees to a "blood oath" to support each other in the interviews, as Big Mike believes the corporate representatives will begin by firing the unnecessary employees. However, when Lester is called in first, he immediately attempts to make a deal to give up the "dirt" on his coworkers for immunity while Big Mike attempts to protect Chuck as the store's best asset. Chuck, in turn, attempts to stand up for Morgan. As Chuck leaves the interview, Del confides in Neil that he believes Chuck is actually Agent Carmichael although Neil is doubtful, revealing that they are Ring operatives and are attempting to locate Castle. Unaware of the danger, Chuck returns to the base and attempts to retrain himself to flash without success.

Lester attempts to spy on the Ring agents during the interviews, and overhears their leader giving them the order to "terminate everyone" but Morgan and Chuck, which leads him to believe that they are to be fired.

Decoy

Meanwhile, Sarah and Shaw trace a Ring phone call to a room at the hotel. The mark is identified by the caller as a man wearing blue and white swim trunks at the pool. As they scan the guests they spot him, and Sarah is stunned to realize that the Ring is after Devon. They intercept him at the pool to warn him, and Devon is incredulous, believing that he was supposed to be in the clear. As Sarah and Shaw attempt to calm him, Casey breaks into the room where the call was placed from and finds it deserted except for a Ring phone set up to play back a message. Casey relays to Sarah and Shaw to stand down, and they release Devon, who is still shaken that Chuck's spy life has once again intruded on his own.

In the hotel room, they debrief with Casey, and begin to put the pieces together that the Ring set them up to draw Shaw into the open and leave Castle undefended. The team realizes that Chuck is on his own.

Jeff is being called into the interview when he begs Morgan to clear contraband from his locker before it can be discovered. As he does so, two of the Ring agents arrive and Morgan hides by the vending machines. Their scanners pick up the hidden entrance to Castle behind the lockers and call in Del and Neil. Morgan is astonished to learn that a CIA base is hidden under the Buy More and follows the group after they break in. Taking cover, he eavesdrops on them as they announce their intentions to steal back all the data the team has on the Ring, and destroy Castle and the store with it.

Morgan tracks down Chuck and reveals everything he has learned. Chuck is stunned, but keeps his cover by playing along. Their attempts to call the police fail, as Castle and all communications in the store are now locked down — Sarah and Shaw are unable to even reach Chuck by phone as they race back from the hotel. Chuck tries to convince Morgan to stand down, but to keep Morgan from revealing Castle's existence to everyone else, he agrees to help provided Morgan keep the secret between them and they get their coworkers out of the store first.

Buy More Revolt and Castle Under Siege

However Big Mike, still believing they are to all be fired, has decided not to give up the store without a fight. The employees barricade themselves inside and refuse to leave when Chuck advises them to do so. They hold a rally and party in the store where Jeffster! performs, while the Ring agents search Castle for Shaw's files. Chuck finally makes contact with the rest of the team via his watch, and is ordered to stand down. He attempts to warn Morgan, but his friend is determined to stop the Ring agents. Unfortunately his actions soon gets them both captured.

Chuck and Morgan are interrogated in Castle's sparring room. Under threat of torture to Morgan, Chuck finally acknowledges that he is, indeed, Agent Carmichael. The Ring operatives leave them alone to deal with Shaw, Sarah and Casey, who have finally returned, during which Chuck explains everything to Morgan, including the Intersect. Chuck is relieved that he finally had the chance to explain everything that was happening in his life, while Morgan points out that regardless of whether his relationship with Sarah was a cover, that his love for her was genuine. The Ring agents successfully locate Shaw's files, and Del orders Neil to have Casey killed when he tries to access Castle from the Buy More, while Sarah and Shaw attempt to get in from the Orange Orange. After gaining entry into the store by revealing his "support" for the revolt, Casey attempts to use the Buy More entrance into Castle, but is locked out. He is ambushed by two Ring agents sent by Neil, but is unwittingly saved by Jeff who, while high on chloroform, knocks out one while Casey disables the other.

Back in Castle,  Del, Neil and the remainder of their team return to finish off Chuck and Morgan. However, after Chuck and Morgan's talk and with his feelings back under control, Chuck is able to flash on advanced martial arts skills and quickly defeats the intruders (with Morgan knocking out Del from behind). Unaware of these events, Casey returns to the Orange Orange after failing to gain access to the facility, where Shaw is preparing to invoke its self-destruct over Sarah's objections that Chuck is still inside, and he would be killed in the process. However just as he's about to activate the self-destruct, the entrance in the freezer opens and to the astonishment of the team, Morgan struts out, greeting Sarah as "Agent Walker" as Chuck emerges behind him.

Aftermath

Shaw insists that Morgan be placed into witness protection, against Chuck's objections. Casey is also unconvinced when Chuck points out Devon knows his secret as well (as Devon is "Awesome" and Morgan is a moron). Chuck counters that Morgan's loyalty matters, and that without his help he would have been unable to flash. Sarah throws her support behind Chuck, and Shaw relents, releasing Morgan. Back at home, Chuck and Morgan relax over a game of Duck Hunt where Chuck's firearms training has Morgan accusing him of cheating with the Intersect. To further distance himself from Chuck's spy life, Devon suggests to Ellie that they join Doctors Without Borders and make a trip to Africa, although Ellie is unsure how to respond. The Buy More revolt ends when Shaw, masquerading as a senior Buy More executive, tells Big Mike that they have decided not to sell the store due to the staff's dedication. Sarah and Shaw are concerned that Castle is compromised, though the Ring agents were blocked from reporting the exact details of the infiltration by their own communications blackout.  Shaw estimates that they have enough time to launch a final offensive against the Ring before having to shut down Castle.  He muses on why the Ring didn't take the opportunity to assassinate him, as their ruse successfully drew him out into the open.

As the episode ends, a Ring phone captured by the team rings while Casey is stowing their gear. When he answers it, a voice greets him personally, mentioning it's been a long time.

Production

"Chuck Versus the Beard" was the television directorial debut of series star Zachary Levi. This announcement first came in an interview on October 11, 2009.

On March 4, four sneak peeks of the episode were released. After the controversy of the previous two episodes, initial critical response to "Chuck Versus the Beard" was strongly positive. In her review of "Chuck Versus the Fake Name" Maureen Ryan in particular compared that episode negatively to "Chuck Versus the Beard".

Production Details

 Although Sarah's real name was revealed in the previous episode, she is not referred to by this name, nor is there any discussion made of it.
 Jeffster! performed Creedence Clearwater Revival's "Fortunate Son" during the Buy More revolt.
 Chuck and Morgan are playing Duck Hunt on their LCD widescreen. However early light gun technology such as Nintendo's Zapper as used in the episode do not work on such televisions. The scene is self-referential to "Chuck Versus Operation Awesome", where Chuck tells Devon his impressive firearms skills are a result of practice in the game. The episode is ambiguous over whether it is Chuck's own firearms training or an Intersect flash that allowed him to so decisively beat Morgan.
 In emulation of Big Mike, Morgan is revealed to have a "fish" mounted on his office wall. In this case, it is a Big Mouth Billy Bass.
 This episode and "Chuck Versus the Ring: Part II" are the only episodes of the season to involve every member of the main cast.
 When Jeffster plays, Jeff seems to be clean while in the scene after, he's high on chloroform.

Flashes

 Chuck flashes on martial arts to protect himself and Morgan.

References to popular culture

 The shot of Big Mike and the employees climbing the piled-up merchandise and planting the Buy More flag on top of the heap recreates Joe Rosenthal's photograph Raising the Flag on Iwo Jima. Later in the episode, two store employees kiss in a recreation of V-J Day in Times Square.
 The red phone Big Mike answers at the end of the episode is a reference to the Moscow-Washington hotline, commonly known as the red phone.
 Big Mike raises a two-fingered salute when he announces the Buy More revolt's victory. This salute and Mike's obesity reference Winston Churchill and his salute at the close of World War II.
 Chuck guesses "the Jackal" as the codename of an assassin when he is trying to flash in Castle. This is a reference to the assassin in Day of the Jackal and its cinematic adaptations, Day of the Jackal and The Jackal.

Reception

The episode received overwhelmingly positive reviews. Mo Ryan of the Chicago Tribune described the episode as "...everything I want in a Chuck episode and then some," particularly citing the depth of the main plot and its integration with the Buy More, and its use of the majority of the main and supporting cast. Alan Sepinwall of the New Jersey Star-Ledger also highly praised the episode, particularly the show finally letting Morgan in on Chuck's secret, and his enthusiastic reaction to his friend's important life as a spy. Sepinwall did note that some of Levi's directing choices were over the top, but otherwise approved of his first stint behind the camera for a television series, and also pointed out that two episodes in a row ended with a "Chuck really loves Sarah" moment. IGN rated the episode a 9.5 out of 10, a series high alongside the Season 2 episodes "Chuck Versus Santa Claus" and "Chuck Versus the Colonel", the Season 4 finale "Chuck Versus the Cliffhanger", and Season 5's "Chuck Versus the Kept Man" and "Chuck Versus the Goodbye".

Viewer response was also overwhelmingly positive, with a 9.9/10 user rating at IMDB.

Daniel Fienberg offered stronger criticism of the episode, finding fault in Levi's direction, with both the main and subplots overly outlandish. Although he did enjoy Morgan's handling of the spy plot and Chuck's secret, and noted it was a revelation that was long overdue, he felt the tone of the episode was off with "wackiness in excess." Like Sepinwall, he criticized the similarity of the endings of both "Chuck Versus the Fake Name" and "Chuck Versus the Beard".

The episode was watched by 6.3 million total viewers, with a 2.3/6 Demo.

References

External links 
 

Beard
2010 American television episodes